Malek Muhamed (born 13 April 1989) is a Sudanese professional footballer who plays as a defender.

External links 

 

1989 births
Living people
Sudanese footballers
Association football defenders
Sudan international footballers
Sudan Premier League players